The Towers at Harbor Court is a residential high-rise complex in Baltimore, Maryland. The structure was completed in 1987. The Towers at Harbor Court complex was developed by Allied Roofing and Sheetmetal, Inc.; the structure is an example of modern architecture. The structure consists entirely of residential condominiums.

See also
 List of tallest buildings in Baltimore

References

Otterbein, Baltimore
Residential condominiums in the United States
Residential skyscrapers in Baltimore
Residential buildings completed in 1987
1980s architecture in the United States